Kala or Kalo Dam is the dam in the Mayurbhanj district in the state of Odisha, India. It is located 8 km from Kaptipada, Mayurbhanj. The Dam is near about 2 km in length and 3.5 km in breadth. It covers a wide area with plenty of water. The Dam provides water throughout the year to the villagers for cultivation and other things.

Characteristics 
The length of the Dam is 2 km. Asanbani,Haripur,Gadhiapaal,kaliasahi,Handiputa,chuuniposi,Nudadhia,Pingu and many more villages depend on this Dam. The Dam also gives some people for earning money by catching and selling the fishes. People buy fresh fishes at cheaper price to compare to the market. The dam glows when the sun rises and the most beautiful sight is the sunset. On every Saturday there is a market near to the main gate of the Dam.

This Guest House is maintained by Govt. of Orissa because a lot of VIPs come here to stay. There is a Guest House where tourists can stay and enjoy their holidays. Many people from different locations come to the Dam for Picnic on Christmas and New-year. But real gathering happens in the New-year.

References 

Mayurbhanj district
Dams in Odisha